was a Japanese painter and print designer of the late 19th and early 20th centuries, part of the  shin-hanga ("new prints") movement. In 1904 he was appointed as an Imperial Household Artist.

Biography 
He received a comprehensive education in various Japanese art styles from the age of 12. In 1880 he received a professorship at the Kyoto School of Painting. Following the publication of the  album in 1892, he became a member of the Art Committee of the imperial court and in 1919 a member of the Imperial Academy of Fine Arts.
 
The  (景年花鳥畫譜), published in 1892, is an album with an extensive series of bird-and-flower in woodblock print.

His works are part of many museum collections throughout the world.

References

Further reading 
 Louise Norton Brown, Book Illustration in Japan (New York: Routledge, 1924), 198–201.
 Jack Hillier, The Art of the Japanese Book, vol. 2 (London: Sotheby's, 1987), 800, 969.
 Helen Merritt and Nanako Yamada, Guide to Modern Japanese Woodblock Prints: 1900-1975 (Honolulu: University of Hawaii Press, 1992), 41.

External links

 https://www.davidsongalleries.com/artists/modern/imao-keinen/

Ukiyo-e
1845 births
1924 deaths
People from Kyoto
Shin hanga artists
20th-century Japanese painters
20th-century printmakers
Imperial household artists